Bhausaheb Babasaheb Nimbalkar (12 December 1919 – 11 December 2012) was an Indian cricketer, best known for his score of 443 not out during the 1948–49 Ranji Trophy, which remains the highest score, and the only quadruple century, in Indian first-class cricket. His score remains the highest by a cricketer not to have played in Test Cricket.

His son, Suryaji Nimbalkar, also played for both Railways and Maharashtra.

Early life 
Nimbalkar was born in Kolhapur. He had his early education at the Model School in Kolhapur, and captained the school team at the age of 15. He made his Ranji Trophy debut in 1939 against Baroda. His older brother, Raosaheb Nimbalkar, also regularly played first-class cricket, and often appeared alongside him in matches.

Career 
During the 1948–49 Ranji Trophy, playing for Maharashtra against Kathiawar at Pune, Nimbalkar made 443 not out, at the time second only to Don Bradman's 452 not out as the record first-class innings and currently fourth-highest of all-time. He was unable to break the record because, with the total standing at 826 for 4 at the lunch interval, the opposing captain, the Thakore Saheb of Rajkot, conceded the match to prevent embarrassment on the part of his team. However, Bradman sent a personal note to Nimbalkar saying that he considered Nimbalkar's innings better than his own.

Despite an impressive batting average of 56.72 in Ranji Trophy matches, and his additional abilities as a wicket-keeper and a fast-medium bowler, Nimbalkar never played Test cricket during a first-class career that stretched from 1939–40 to 1964–65.

Later years and death 
Nimbalkar died in December 2012, aged 92.

References

External links

Nimbalkar recalls Bradman's 'personal message'

1919 births
2012 deaths
Baroda cricketers
Holkar cricketers
Indian cricketers
Madhya Bharat cricketers
Maharashtra cricketers
People from Kolhapur
Railways cricketers
Rajasthan cricketers
East Zone cricketers
Central Zone cricketers
West Zone cricketers
Indian Starlets cricketers
Wicket-keepers